Quanzhou (全州镇) is a town in Quanzhou County, Guangxi, China. In 1851 the town's population was massacred by rebel forces during the Taiping rebellion after a Qing soldier from the city fired a shot that killed Feng Yunshan. 

Towns of Guilin
Quanzhou County